Batsère is a commune in the Hautes-Pyrénées department in southwestern France.

Geography 
Batsère is a rural commune with 33 inhabitants in 2019. there was a peak population of 179 in 1872. Its inhabitants are called Batsérois or Batséroises.

It is located 26 km (orthodromic distance) from Tarbes, prefecture of the department and 11 km from Bagnères-de-Bigorre.

The territory of the commune is vulnerable to various natural hazards: meteorological (storms, thunderstorms, snow, extreme cold, heat wave or drought), floods, forest fires, land movements and earthquakes (medium seismicity).

Population

See also
Communes of the Hautes-Pyrénées department

References

Communes of Hautes-Pyrénées